Preplasmiviricota is a phylum of viruses.

Taxonomy
The phylum contains the following classes:

 Maveriviricetes
 Polintoviricetes
 Tectiliviricetes

References

Viruses